The Xfm Top 1000 Songs of All Time is a musical reference book edited by various DJs, of the now defunct radio station Xfm, which was published by Elliott & Thompson Limited in 2010. The only edition comprises a list of singles and popular album tracks released between 1965 and 2009. The book is arranged alphabetically rather than in the form of a chart, while Brandon Flowers of The Killers provides a foreword.

The list was determined by listener votes of the radio station voting on their website, opinions from DJs and radio play requests on the station's flagship show The X-List. The station formerly broadcast to London and Manchester on digital DAB radio, and online to the rest of the world, with nearly 1 million listeners. The station also had a close relationship with Australian station Triple J. Each entry in the list is accompanied by a short essay written by a DJ. The entries are accompanied by pictures, quotes, and additional information. As mentioned before, the list not only included singles, but also album-only tracks that entered public knowledge, with Led Zeppelin's "Stairway to Heaven" and Pink Floyd's "Comfortably Numb" being examples.

Although the book mostly keeps to alternative rock acts of the present day, as well as classic bands such as The Beatles while the most recent singles in the book take up most of the list, many artists who appeared expressed their achievement as a highlight of their career, with a small number writing on the Xfm official site and also in the book itself.

See also

 1001 Albums You Must Hear Before You Die
 1,000 Recordings to Hear Before You Die
 The Pitchfork 500

References

External links
Section dedicated to the book on the official XFM Website

2010 non-fiction books
Music guides